Emanuele Ferrari (born October 6, 1975 in Milan, Italy) is an Italian fashion photographer.

Early life
Born in Milan in 1975, Emanuele has worked in the professional
photography world for about ten years.
He has collaborated with several famous brands and boasts publications
in international magazines.
The only Italian – for two years in a row – included among the top 20
most influential international photographers of the web according to
the WIP index (Web Popolarity Index),he is recognised for his simple,
irreverent and never banal style.

Work 
He has created advertising campaigns and editorials for the brands Diesel, Etam, Twin Set, Tezenis, Krizia, Moschino, LIU JO, Sony Italy, Nike, Coca Cola, Fila, Calzedonia, Fendi, Zalando, Marc Jacobs, MAC Cosmetics
Over the years, he worked for magazines such as El País Icon, Purple, and i-D., Vogue , Cosmopolitan, Nylon, D La Repubblica, Rolling Stones, Vanity Fair.
He's represented by ART PARTNER Licensing.

Selected clients
Diesel, Etam, Twin Set, Tezenis, Krizia, Moschino, LIU JO, Sony Italy, Nike, Coca Cola, Fila, Calzedonia, Fendi, Zalando, Marc Jacobs, MAC Cosmetics, Vogue , Cosmopolitan, Nylon, D La Repubblica, Rolling Stones, Vanity Fair, iD, Purple, El Pais

Publications 
Choice of publications
iD
Vogue
Nylon
Rolling Stones
Purple
Vanity Fair
Cosmopolitan
D La Repubblica
El Pais

References

External links
 Art Parner Licensing Roster
 Profile page on models.com
 Profile page
 Instagram page

Fashion photographers
Photographers from Milan
1975 births
Living people